Jakob Johann Laub (born as Jakub Laub, 7 February 1884 in Rzeszów – 22 April 1962 in Fribourg) was a physicist from Austria-Hungary, who is best known for his work with Albert Einstein in the early period of special relativity.

Life
He was the son of Abraham Laub and Anna Maria Schenborn. Laub, who converted from the Jewish to the Catholic faith and changed his name from "Jakub" into "Jakob Johann", first visited High School in Rzeszów. Next stations were the University of Vienna, the University of Kraków and finally the University of Göttingen, where he studied mathematics under David Hilbert, Woldemar Voigt, Walther Nernst, Karl Schwarzschild and Hermann Minkowski. Afterwards he went to the University of Würzburg, where he attained a doctorate in 1907. Soon he established closer contact to Wilhelm Wien, Arnold Sommerfeld, Johannes Stark, and Albert Einstein. When he travelled to Bern in 1908 to visit Einstein (with whom it corresponded later frequently and was friendly) he found him still working as a patent employee. This he called a "stair joke [Treppenwitz] of history". In 1909 he became co-worker of Philipp Lenard at the University of Heidelberg.

In 1911 he emigrated with his wife Ruth Elisa Wendt to Argentina. There he worked at the geophysical and astronomical observatory in La Plata. Afterwards he obtained a leading position at a Physics Department in Buenos Aires. After accepting the Argentine nationality (with the Spanish first name variant "Jacobo Juan") he began to work in the Diplomatic service of Argentina. In 1947 he returned to Germany. In his new home town Freiburg he went into economic troubles and therefore sold a part of his correspondence with Einstein.

Scientific Work

In 1905 he investigated cathode rays together with Wilhelm Wien. Afterwards he investigated some topics on special relativity and wrote in 1907 an important work on the optics of moving bodies. In 1908 he wrote several works together with Einstein on the basic electromagnetic equations, which was aimed to replace the four-dimensional formulation of the electrodynamics by Minkowski by a simpler, classical formulation. Both Laub and Einstein discounted the spacetime formalism as too complicated. However, it turned out that Minkowski's spacetime formalism was fundamental for the further development of special relativity. Laub also published some papers on relativistic effects within gases and in 1910 he wrote one of the first survey articles on relativity. Also in the following years Laub still wrote many scientific papers on different topics.

See also
History of special relativity

References

Publications

External links
http://wikisource.org/wiki/Autor:Jakob_Laub

20th-century Argentine physicists
20th-century Austrian physicists
20th-century German physicists
Converts to Roman Catholicism from Judaism
University of Vienna alumni
Jagiellonian University alumni
Austrian emigrants to Argentina
Argentine people of Austrian-Jewish descent
Laub, Jakobl
1962 deaths